Tetragonoderus latipennis is a species of beetle in the family Carabidae. It was described by John Lawrence LeConte in 1874.

References

latipennis
Beetles described in 1874
Taxa named by John Lawrence LeConte